Deborah Squash (born –?) was a slave on George Washington's Mount Vernon plantation before she escaped in 1781. She went to New Amsterdam, which was the headquarters for the British during the American Revolution. At the end of the war, she was one of the 3,000 blacks in the Book of Negroes that sailed on a British ship for Nova Scotia.

Mount Vernon

Deborah was enslaved on George and Martha Washington's Mount Vernon plantation as a child. The Washingtons held about 300 slaves, who were expected to work hard. Washington's slaves were considered to have "highly developed skills" and were considered "valuable property". During the American Revolutionary War, Washington was interested in selling off his slaves, particularly single people (to avoid separating husbands and wives), because he was "desperately in need of money". Single African-Americans at Mount Vernon were aware that they could be sold at any time. Nine people were sold in 1779 and Washington had asked his cousin and overseer Lund Washington to check the market for good prices for the remaining single slaves.

Dunmore's proclamation
During the American Revolutionary War, Lord Dunmore, governor of the Colony of Virginia issued a proclamation in 1775 that granted freedom to those who left their owners and joined the ranks of the British Army. Sir Henry Clinton, the British Commander-in-chief at New York, determined that the British were losing the war, and issued the Philipsburg Proclamation (1779) in which any black person who became loyal to the British would receive freedom, protection, and land.

Escape to New York
At age 16, Deborah saw her opportunity to escape in April 1781 when the British ship HMS Savage arrived within a quarter of a mile from Mount Vernon as it plundered and set houses on fire on its way along the Potomac River. Leaving Mount Vernon was a leap of faith—that the British would honor their offer of freedom and that she would be able to acquire a job to support herself.

She and sixteen other enslaved people, all single, ran with her to board the ship. Lund Washington, a cousin of George Washington and an overseer on the plantation, tried to win the blacks back by exchanging them for supplies. The ship's captain, Thomas Graves, took the provisions, but he did not release the plantation workers. They became several of thousands of runaways who had followed the British Army, who were ill-equipped to feed and properly care for the health of so many people. It is estimated by historians that almost 50% of the people who followed the British Army died before the war's end due to disease, starvation, or the cold temperatures.

Deborah survived having acquired smallpox that left her face pock-marked and made her way to New Amsterdam, the headquarters for the British military during the war. Henry Squash, who also escaped enslavement, came to New Amsterdam and was sold by Capt. Huddleston of the Royal Artillery to Mr. Lynch. Henry and Deborah were married.

Transported to Nova Scotia

The war ended in 1783 and under the terms of the Treaty of Paris, the British were to return all runaways to slavery. Sir Guy Carleton, who was responsible for the evacuation of British forces from the colonies, feared their treatment upon their return to their owners. He refused to return the African-Americans, but offered monetary compensation for each runaway, which was accepted by George Washington. The Book of Negroes listed each black person who boarded a British ship in New York. Deborah was listed as having been about 20 years of age, married to Henry, and was believed to have escaped four years ago. She received her certificate of freedom from General Samuel Birch.

On April 27, 1783, Deborah and Henry boarded a ship named Polly for Port Roseway, Nova Scotia. She narrowly missed being returned to Mount Vernon when Washington wrote the following day to the commissioner of embarkation at New York to ask him to hold any of his slaves.

Nova Scotia
Deborah arrived at Port Rosey, but the Canadians were unequipped to manage a large influx of people. Many people initially lived in temporary housing – such as pit houses, tents, or huts. Although there was promise of land, most people did not receive land, and if they did it was often unsuitable to farm. If a black person had a skill, they took up a trade, but were not paid as much as white people. Those who did not have a trade became indentured servants and were treated like slaves. Slavery was legal in Nova Scotia at the time. Angered that blacks were paid less and therefore had more customers, a group of former white soldiers commenced Canada's first race riot in July 1784 when they destroyed the homes of 20 blacks in Port Rosey (now Shelburne). Many blacks died due to illness, poverty, starvation, and harsh winters. Able to freely worship, blacks found religion and spiritual songs to help them cope with their hardships.

Within about a year after she arrived in Port Rosey, she settled in Birchtown, Nova Scotia, where she appears on the Birchtown Muster of 1784. By that time, she is no longer with Henry Squash, who has presumed to have died. She is listed as Deborah Lynch, living in a house with Mr. Lynch. In the same house was Neil Robinson, who is believed to have changed his name from Jack Neal.

Of about 1,500 Black Loyalists who settled in Shelburne County, Nova Scotia, most settled in Port Rosey and some settled in the town of Birchtown, which was named after General Samuel Birch. Colonel Stephen Blucke, a Black Loyalist, led the Black Pioneers in the construction of the towns of Port Rosey and Birchtown.

Legacy
The story of her life and what it was like to be a slave was told in the book "Slavery in New York," which became an exhibit in New York.

See also 
 List of enslaved people of Mount Vernon
 George Washington and slavery

Notes

References

1760s births
Year of birth uncertain
Year of death unknown
Mount Vernon slaves
American former slaves
African Americans in the American Revolution
Black Loyalists
Black Nova Scotians
18th-century African-American women